Maria Patricia Kelly (born 25 November 1969) is an Irish-American singer and songwriter. Born in Gamonal, Spain, she came to prominence with her musical family The Kelly Family, a multi-generational pop group that achieved success in Europe in the 1990s. During their hiatus, Kelly released several solo albums.

Discography

Studio albums

Live CDs
 Essential (double CD) (2011)
 Songs & Stories (2015)
 Grace&Kelly - Live in concert (2016)
 My Christmas Concert (2020)

EPs
 A New Room (2008)
 Essential (2009)

DVDs
 Von Geist der Weihnacht (musical) (2009)
 Essential (live DVD)
 Grace&Kelly - live in concert (2016)

References

External links
 Official website

1969 births
Living people
Irish people of American descent
Irish people of Spanish descent
American people of Spanish descent
20th-century American singers
21st-century American singers
20th-century American women singers
21st-century American women singers